The men's 400 metres hurdles was an event at the 1976 Summer Olympics in Montreal. The competition was held from July 23, 1976, to July 25, 1976. There were 22 competitors from 16 nations. The maximum number of athletes per nation had been set at 3 since the 1930 Olympic Congress. American Edwin Moses won the final in a world record and Olympic record time of 47.64 seconds. His time was initially noted as one hundredth slower, but this was rounded up after an analysis of the photo finish. It was the United States' first victory in the event since 1964 and 12th overall. Fellow American Michael Shine took silver. Yevgeniy Gavrilenko earned the Soviet Union's first medal in the event since 1952 with his bronze. Great Britain's three-Games podium streak in the event ended.

Background
This was the 16th time the event was held. It had been introduced along with the men's 200 metres hurdles in 1900, with the 200 being dropped after 1904 and the 400 being held through 1908 before being left off the 1912 programme. However, when the Olympics returned in 1920 after World War I, the men's 400 metres hurdles was back and would continue to be contested at every Games thereafter.

Two of the eight finalists from the 1972 Games returned: the joint sixth-place finishers Yevgeny Gavrilenko of the Soviet Union and Stavros Tziortzis of Greece. The favorite would have been reigning champion John Akii-Bua of Uganda, but the African boycott of the 1976 Games prevented him from competing. Without him, the field was relatively weak. European and Commonwealth champion Alan Pascoe of Great Britain was hampered by a leg injury. None of the Americans were particularly prominent; the United States team was led by Edwin Moses, a hurdler competing in his first international meet, though would go on to become the preeminent athlete in the event.

Antigua and Barbuda, Bulgaria, Kuwait, and Saudi Arabia each made their debut in the event. The United States made its 16th appearance, the only nation to have competed at every edition of the event to that point.

Competition format
The competition used the three-round format used every Games since 1908 (except the four-round competition in 1952): quarterfinals, semifinals, and a final. Ten sets of hurdles were set on the course. The hurdles were 3 feet (91.5 centimetres) tall and were placed 35 metres apart beginning 45 metres from the starting line, resulting in a 40 metres home stretch after the last hurdle. The 400 metres track was standard.

There were 4 quarterfinal heats with 5 or 6 athletes each. The top 4 men in each quarterfinal advanced to the semifinals. The 16 semifinalists were divided into 2 semifinals of 8 athletes each, with the top 4 in each semifinal advancing to the 8-man final.

Records
These were the standing world and Olympic records (in seconds) prior to the 1976 Summer Olympics.

Edwin Moses set a new world record in the final with a time of 47.64 seconds.

Schedule

All times are Eastern Daylight Time (UTC-4)

Results

Quarterfinals
The quarterfinals were held on July 23, 1976.

Quarterfinal 1

Quarterfinal 2

Quarterfinal 3

Quarterfinal 4

Semifinals
The semifinals were held on July 24, 1976.

Semifinal 1

Semifinal 2

Final
The final was held on July 25, 1976.

Results summary

References

 1
400 metres hurdles at the Olympics
Men's events at the 1976 Summer Olympics